The Statute Law (Repeals) Act 1969 is an Act of the Parliament of the United Kingdom.

It implemented recommendations contained in the first report on statute law revision made by the Law Commission.

The enactments which were repealed (whether for the whole or any part of the United Kingdom) by this Act were repealed so far as they extended to the Isle of Man on 25 July 1991.

Section 1 - Repeal of enactments
Refers to the schedules for the complete list of repealed laws and the extent of repeals.

This section was repealed by Group 2 of Part IX of Schedule 1 to the Statute Law (Repeals) Act 1998.

Section 2 - Advowsons
Amends the Statute of Westminster 1285 to clarify the proceedings of Advowsons in case of Quare impedit.

Section 2(3) was repealed by Group 2 of Part IX of Schedule 1 to the Statute Law (Repeals) Act 1998.

Section 3 - Rentcharges, etc., under Copyhold Act 1894
Defines the owner's rights for rent charges that survive the repeal of the Copyhold Act 1894.

Section 4 - Savings
Lists specific provisions that survive the repeals of the Sunday Fairs Act 1448, the Clergy Act 1533, the Appointment of Bishops Act 1533, the Ecclesiastical Licences Act 1533, the Suffragan Bishops Act 1534, and selected sections of the Act of Supremacy.

Section 4(3) was repealed by section 6(3) of, and Schedule 2 to, the Church of England (Worship and Doctrine) Measure 1974 (No. 3).

Section 5 - Provisions relating to Northern Ireland
Defines sections and schedules which do not apply to Northern Ireland unless confirmed by its Parliament, and which sections of Irish Church Act 1869 should survive the repeals.

The words "and so much of this Act as repeals the enactments mentioned in Parts III and IV of the Schedule", in section 5(1), were repealed by Group 2 of Part IX of Schedule 1 to the Statute Law (Repeals) Act 1998.

The words from "but" onwards in section 5(1), and the words from "and" onwards in section 5(2), were repealed by section 41(1)(a) of, and Part I of Schedule 6 to, the Northern Ireland Constitution Act 1973.

Section 6 - Application to Channel Island and Isle of Man
Defines that only the repeal of Societies (Miscellaneous Provisions) Act 1940 applies to Channel Islands and Isle of Man.

This section was repealed by Group 2 of Part IX of Schedule 1 to the Statute Law (Repeals) Act 1998.

Schedule - Enactments repealed

The Schedule was repealed by Group 2 of Part IX of Schedule 1 to the Statute Law (Repeals) Act 1998.

Part I. Constitutional Enactments 
Repeals most of Magna Carta (1297) except articles 1, 9, 29, and 37; also repeals the Lord Keeper Act 1562, the Ship Money Act 1640, and the Parliament Act 1660, among others.

Part II. Ecclesiastical Enactments 
Repeals the Act of Supremacy (1558) except section 8, the Act of Uniformity 1548 except section 7, the Act of Uniformity 1558 except section 13, and various other enactments.

Part III. Law of Property Enactments 
Repeals the Copyhold Act 1894 and various other enactments.

Part IV. Enactments relating to Sunday Observance 
Repeals the Sunday Fairs Act 1448, the  Sunday Observance Acts 1625 and 1677, and various other enactments.

Part V. Hallmarking Enactments

Part VI. Enactments relating to the Commonwealth

Part VII. Miscellaneous Enactments

Part VIII. Acts of the Parliament of Ireland

Part IX. Church Assembly Measures

See also
Statute Law (Repeals) Act

References
Halsbury's Statutes. Fourth Edition. 2008 Reissue. Volume 41. Page 773.

External links
The Statute Law (Repeals) Act 1969, as amended from the National Archives.
The Statute Law (Repeals) Act 1969, as originally enacted from the National Archives.

United Kingdom Acts of Parliament 1969